Tropidophorus matsuii is a species of skink found in Thailand.

References

matsuii
Reptiles of Thailand
Reptiles described in 2002
Taxa named by Tsutomu Hikida
Taxa named by Nikolai Loutseranovitch Orlov
Taxa named by Hidetoshi Ota